A violin concerto is a composition for violin and orchestra.

Violin Concerto may also refer to:
 Violin Concerto (Adams)
 Violin Concerto (Adès)
 Violin Concerto (Barber)
 Violin Concerto (Bates)
 Violin Concerto (Beethoven)
 Violin Concerto (Berg)
 Violin Concerto (Bergsma)
 Violin Concerto (Brahms)
 Violin Concerto (Britten)
 Violin Concerto (Bruch)
 Violin Concerto (Carter)
 Violin Concerto (Chávez)
 Violin Concerto (Davies)
 Violin Concerto (Dvořák)
 Violin Concerto (Elfman)
 Violin Concerto (Elgar)
 Violin Concerto (Fauré)
 Violin Concerto (Glass)
 Violin Concerto (Glazunov)
 Violin Concerto (Higdon)
 Violin Concerto (Khachaturian)
 Violin Concerto (Korngold)
 Violin Concerto (Ligeti)
 Violin Concerto (MacMillan)
 Violin Concerto (Mendelssohn)
 Violin Concerto (Nielsen)
 Violin Concerto (Panufnik)
 Violin Concerto (Ponce)
 Violin Concerto (Previn)
 Violin Concerto (Ries)
 Violin Concerto (Riisager)
 Violin Concerto (Rorem)
 Violin Concerto (Rouse)
 Violin Concerto (Rózsa)
 Violin Concerto (Rubinstein)
 Violin Concerto (Salonen)
 Violin Concerto (Schoenberg)
 Violin Concerto (Schumann)
 Violin Concerto (Sessions)
 Violin Concerto (Sibelius)
 Violin Concerto (Somervell)
 Violin Concerto (Strauss)
 Violin Concerto (Stravinsky)
 Violin Concerto (Tchaikovsky)
 Violin Concerto (Tower)
 Violin Concerto (Walton)
 Violin Concerto (Zwilich)
 Violin Concerto (album), a 1999 recording by Joshua Bell of a composition by Nicholas Maw

See also
 List of compositions for violin and orchestra